Encephalartos schaijesii is a species of cycad endemic to the Democratic Republic of the Congo. It is only found near Kolwezi in Shaba Province, Democratic Republic of the Congo. It occurs in Miombo woodlands.

Description
It is a cycad with a more or less underground stem, up to 25 cm high and with a diameter of 20-30 cm, often with secondary stems originating from shoots that arise at the base of the main stem. 

The leaves, pinnate, erect, 80–120 cm long, are arranged in a crown at the apex of the stem and are supported by a 2 cm long petiole; each leaf is composed of 48-58 pairs of lanceolate leaflets, with a spiny green glaucous margin, inserted on the rachis at an angle of 70-75°.

It is a dioecious species with male specimens that have a single cone, 15–17 cm long and 4–4.5 cm wide, of greenish-yellow color, and female specimens also with a single cylindrical-ovoid cone, erect, long 29–32 cm and 12–15 cm in diameter, gray to greenish in color.

References

External links

schaijesii